Maurice Edward Youmans (born October 16, 1936 in Eagle Bay, New York) is a former American football defensive end in the National Football League for the Chicago Bears and Dallas Cowboys. He played college football at Syracuse University.

Early years
Youmans attended North Syracuse High School, where he initially focused on playing basketball and averaged 20 points a game. He started playing football as a senior. After graduating, he spent one year at Dean Academy to improve his grades.

He accepted a scholarship from Syracuse University and was redshirted as a junior after having back surgery.

As a senior, he became part of a defensive/offensive line known as the "sizeable seven" that also included Bob Yates, Fred Mautino, Al Bemiller, Roger Davis, Bruce Tarbox and Gerry Skonieczki. He blocked for Ernie Davis and was a member of the undefeated national championship team in 1959.

He also lettered in basketball, where he was a backup at center as a sophomore and senior.

Professional career

Chicago Bears
Youmans was selected by the Chicago Bears in the ninth round (105th overall) of the 1959 NFL Draft with a future draft pick, which allowed the team to draft him before his college eligibility was over.

As a rookie, he played left defensive end and his bookend partner was future hall of famer Doug Atkins, but missed games with a dislocated shoulder. After playing all of the games (14) in 1962, the next season he was kneed in the back and missed 8 games.

In 1963, he was placed on the injured reserve list with a knee injury that was complicated by a serious infection. He would end up missing the season the Bears won the NFL Championship.

The next year, he requested a trade thinking he was going to the Green Bay Packers, but instead was sent to the Dallas Cowboys in exchange for offensive end Gary Barnes on June 18, 1964.

Dallas Cowboys
In 1964, he was the defensive line's top backup and started the last 3 games in place of an injured Larry Stephens. The next season, he was the regular starter at left defensive end, but was limited with an unstable knee.

Atlanta Falcons
After being selected by the Atlanta Falcons in the 1966 NFL expansion draft, he was traded to the New York Giants.

New York Giants
A knee operation didn't allow him to participate in the New York Giants training camp and was released on September 6, 1966.

References

External links
 Super Entrances for a Football Giant

1936 births
Living people
Sportspeople from New York (state)
Players of American football from New York (state)
American football defensive ends
Syracuse Orange football players
Syracuse Orange men's basketball players
Chicago Bears players
Dallas Cowboys players
American men's basketball players
Centers (basketball)